Greg Fleming (born 29 January 1973 in Newcastle, New South Wales) is an Australian former professional rugby league footballer who played in the 1990s and 2000s.

He played for Perth Reds and Canterbury Bulldogs in the NRL. In the Super League he played for London Broncos.

References

External links
NRL points
London Broncos profile
Canterbury Bulldogs profile
Broncos lose Fleming

1973 births
Living people
Australian expatriate sportspeople in England
Australian rugby league players
Canterbury-Bankstown Bulldogs players
London Broncos players
Rugby league centres
Rugby league fullbacks
Rugby league players from Newcastle, New South Wales
Western Reds players